Yamit was an Israeli settlement  in the northern part of the Sinai Peninsula with a population of about 2,500 people. Yamit was established during Israel's occupation of the peninsula from the end of the 1967 Six-Day War until that part of the Sinai was handed over to Egypt in April 1982, as part of the terms of the 1979 Egypt–Israel peace treaty. Prior to the return of the land to Egypt, all the homes were evacuated and bulldozed.

History
Located in the Rafah Plain region south of the Gaza Strip, Yamit was envisioned as a large city for 200,000 people that would create a buffer zone between the Gaza Strip and the Sinai Peninsula. It was built on land in a 140,000 dunam (14,000 hectare) area from which some 1,500 Bedouin families of the Al-Ramilat tribes had been secretly expelled under the direct orders of the then-defense minister Moshe Dayan and Southern Command head Ariel Sharon. Construction of Yamit began in January 1975. When the first fifty residents arrived there were no buildings, roads, electricity or water. Nevertheless, ambitious plans were drawn up for a port, a flour mill, a Dead Sea Canal, a hotel and a university. A cornerstone was laid for a yeshiva. By the second year, the population reached 100.   

Despite efforts to promote Yamit's relatively affordable housing, Yamit did not attract enough residents to make it a seaport. Upon the signing of the peace treaty with Egypt in 1979, it became clear to residents that Yamit's days were numbered. Most accepted compensation and relocated to other cities. Those who chose to stay were joined by nationalist supporters who moved in to boost their numbers. When the order came to evacuate Yamit by force, many of the residents barricaded themselves inside their homes, while others climbed up to their roofs as soldiers broke down their doors.

Prior to the establishment of Yamit, the area south of Gaza known as the Rafah salient had been home to Bedouin farmers who "tended almond, peach, olive, and castor-oil trees and patches of wheat. Near the coastline, where groundwater rose almost to the surface, they farmed a strip a few hundred meters wide that yielded richer crops. Herds of sheep and goats added to their livelihood. They were settled tribes; some lived in tents, but more in tin shacks and concrete houses'.

The tribal sheikhs claimed 20,000 people were affected by the expulsion. Israeli army statistics put the number of expelled at 4,950. Those with tents were given a day to remove them. Those in concrete houses were given an extra day to leave, and their homes were reduced to rubble. Bulldozers, following a map design drawn by Sharon, drove down a swathe extending several dozen metres wide where the Bedouins were encamped, and smashed everything in their way. The decision to build Yamit was approved by the Israeli government in September 1973.

Settling northeastern Sinai was an idea strongly promoted by Moshe Dayan. The idea was subsequently proposed in a document on Israeli policy in the occupied territories written by Yisrael Galili, drafted to bridge the gap between hardliners and moderates in the Israeli Labour Party. According to one Israeli kibbutznik who visited the area immediately after the expulsion:
 "A group of members from kibbutzim in the region, including me, started to investigate. We went out and toured the area, and were stunned by the dimensions of the wreckage, and by the number of persons who were expelled. The Israel Defense Forces (IDF) and the government denied the facts that we presented, and claimed that they had merely evacuated a few nomads from state lands onto which the nomads had recently encroached."

The expulsion was not mentioned in the Israeli press. A month later, the head of the International Committee of the Red Cross met and raised the issue with Dayan's viceroy in the territories, Shlomo Gazit, who knew nothing of it. The IDF chief of staff David Elazar, on being informed, flew over the area by helicopter to see for himself and subsequently appointed a commission to investigate what Ariel Sharon had done.

The subsequent inquiry revealed that the expulsion of the Bedouins had occurred under Dayan's personal initiative and without government authorization. Golda Meir's government implemented the pre-prepared plan for settlements on this Bedouin territory. According to one source, it was this official decision to establish a large Israeli city at Yamit which, for Anwar Sadat and senior Egyptian officials, "was the straw that broke the camel's back", eventuating in the loss of hopes for a peace agreement and the onset of the Yom Kippur War. Avi Shlaim argues however that the Arab decision to go to war preceded the Galilee Document's publication. Nonetheless, Dayan made public remarks about his intention to build a deep-water port at Yamit, cutting Egypt off from the Gaza Strip and Sadat is on record as saying: "Every word spoken about Yamit is a knife pointing at me personally and at my self-respect."

Local kibbutzniks were outraged by the destruction and, on consultation with the tribal chief, Suleiman Hussein Uda Abu Hilo, arranged for a human rights lawyer to appeal on their behalf. Some kibbutzniks, among them Oded Lifshitz, and Latif Dori, were also activists in the left-wing Mapam party and ran Rafiah tours in order to show Israelis the destruction that had taken place, and to bring to public attention the fact that the image of the Bedouin as nomads was inexact, and that their orchards were being bulldozed.  In July 1972, nine Bedouin sheikhs from the area petitioned the Supreme Court of Israel in order to obtain an order permitting them to return to their homes. Their case was presented by a Mapam man, Haim Holzman, who argued that the evacuation had no legal or military rationale, and violated the Geneva Convention. Ariel Sharon was ordered by the court to show cause for the expulsion. General Israel Tal gave a deposition arguing that the Rafiah Plain area had been used by terrorists, who had attacked Israelis, as a shelter. A buffer zone, involving "Jewish settlement and presence" between Egypt and the Gaza Strip, was required for security reasons. Holzmann replied, arguing that Tal's own maps showed terrorist attacks had been in decline, and the incidents enumerated lay outside the zone where the expulsion had taken place. Holzmann died of a heart attack before his summation, later given by his law partner, could be delivered. While the case was still pending, Dayan secretly asked Tel Aviv architects Yehuda Drexler and Ze'ev Drukman to draw up a blueprint for the projected port town of Yamit. The design brochure they produced was then sequestered by the IDF to ensure that the material would not come to the court's attention.

Dayan envisaged a metropolis whose population would be expanded to a quarter of a million people by the year 2000. His plan was shelved because its cost would have had serious consequences for Israel's poor. The first residents arrived in August 1975 and the population quickly expanded. Two settlement blocs surrounded it: to the east lay Pri'el, Talme Yosef, Netiv, Ha-Asara, Ugda, Nir Avraham, Prigan, Sadot, Diqua, and the block centre Avshalom, while south of Yamit, settlements were made at Atzmona, Tarsag and Ne'ot Sinai. Most of the population was composed of secular Israelis who were attracted to the pristine settings near the Mediterranean and the low cost of housing. The settlement was positioned about half a kilometer away from the shore, adjacent to Bedouins who lived nearby along the shoreline itself.

Evacuation
The evacuation of Yamit was part of the final stage of Israeli evacuation from Sinai. It was carried out in the face of powerful domestic opposition in Israel. Moshe Arens (of the Likud party),  the head of the Knesset's Foreign Affairs and Defense Committee, and professor Yuval Ne'eman, the leader of the right-wing Tehiya party, led that opposition.  They wanted to stop the evacuation and revoke the peace treaty with Egypt, arguing, that once Egypt had the entire Sinai, it would cancel the peace treaty with Israel and rejoin the rest of the Arab world.
Yamit was evacuated on April 23, 1982 amid resistance by some Yamit settlers and other supporters. Some residents barricaded themselves on the rooftops before being dragged into buses by Israeli soldiers. Political extremists from the rest of the country infiltrated Yamit to demonstrate their solidarity and sabotage the withdrawal. Among the more extreme examples of resistance were the disciples of Rabbi Meir Kahane, who vowed to take their own lives rather than surrender. After the personal intervention of Kahane, they agreed to leave.

The initial agreement between Israel and Egypt stipulated that Egypt would pay $80 million for the houses and infrastructure of Yamit. Ariel Sharon decided to destroy the settlement. Sharon claimed that he made the decision in response to an Egyptian request, but this was not the case. According to the Israeli ambassador to Egypt at the time, Moshe Sasson, Begin feared that the Israeli settlers would return to their homes surreptitiously and a disastrous clash between them and the Egyptians might occur. One suggestion was that Sharon deliberately made the whole process more traumatic than it needed to be, so that the Israeli public would refuse the dismantling of other settlements even for the sake of peace.

Since the demolition, the only structure that remains visible is a skeleton of the main synagogue, which contains no visible Jewish symbols.

References

Former Israeli settlements in Sinai
1967 establishments in the Israeli Military Governorate
1982 disestablishments in the Israeli Military Governorate